Cheekha Dar,  which means Black Tent, is the local Kurdish name for the mountain, located in Kurdistan Region of Iraq, currently thought to be the highest in Iraq.

It was climbed in November 2004 by English explorer Ginge Fullen, who recorded a GPS reading of 3,628 meters at the coordinates in the adjacent table. The location is consistent with SRTM and Russian topographic mapping, although these sources are more consistent with the CIA height.

The first reported winter ascent was by Jonathan Beswick and Matthew DuPuy on March 18, 2011. The expedition GPS confirmed . There is a danger of land mines in the area on approach between Hamilton Road and the village of Gundah Zhur. Some fields are marked by red, triangular signs with skull and crossbones. It is possible to find Kurdish military escorts through this area in the town of Choman.

See also 
 Iraqi Kurdistan
 List of elevation extremes by country

References

Mountains of Iraq
Mountains of Kurdistan
International mountains of Asia
Iran–Iraq border
Highest points of countries
Mountains of Kurdistan Province
Mountains of Iran